Dou Yupei (born September 1957) is a former Chinese politician, and Vice Minister of Civil Affairs. He was dismissed from his position in January 2017 for investigation by the Central Commission for Discipline Inspection.

Early life and education
Dou Yupei was born in Tianjin. He joined the CPC in 1982 and graduated from Nankai University.

Career 
In 1990, Dou served as the director of Resettlement Office of Ministry of Civil Affairs, and transferred to the director of Department of Social Affairs in 1996. 

In 2003 he became the director of the Office of Ministry of Civil Affairs, and promoted to the Vice Minister from 2006 to 2016. 

In 2009, he was appointed as the Vice President of the Red Cross Society of China until 2015.

Investigation
On January 9, 2017, Dou Yupei was under investigated by the Central Commission for Discipline Inspection, according to the news conference statement.

On February 8, 2017, Dou was given a serious warning and ordered to retire early.

References

Living people
1957 births
Chinese Communist Party politicians from Tianjin
People's Republic of China politicians from Tianjin
Politicians from Tianjin
Nankai University alumni